Life in the Country may refer to:
 Life in the Country (1943 film), a Swedish historical comedy film
 Life in the Country (1924 film), a Swedish silent drama film